The Israeli Liberal Party, also known as the Liberal Party in Israel (Miflaga Libralit BeYisrael) was a political party in Israel and one of the forerunners of the modern-day Likud. The party was created by a 1961 merger between the centrist Progressive Party and the General Zionists, forming a right-leaning, middle class-based party. The Progressives soon seceded to form the Independent Liberals in 1964.

History

The Liberal Party had its roots in the General Zionists, centrists who sought to unify all Zionists without regard to socialist, revisionist, or religious leanings, and stressed industrial development and private enterprise. The group split into two wings in 1935: the majority, General Zionists A, led by Chaim Weizman, were on the left; General Zionists B were on the right. Both were made up of industrialists, merchants, landlords, white-collar professionals, and intellectuals. They merged again in 1946 to form the General Zionist party, but split again in 1948 when group A helped form the Progressive Party.

The Liberal Party was formed on 8 May 1961, towards the end of the fourth Knesset when the two parties merged again, together holding 14 Knesset seats. Early elections were called for 1961 after the General Zionists and Herut brought a motion of no-confidence in the government over the Lavon Affair. In the 1961 elections the party won 17 seats, the same number as Herut, making it the joint-second largest after David Ben-Gurion's Mapai.

Early in 1964, spontaneous appeals arose among centrists and rightists of all factions for a joint parliamentary bloc to undermine Mapai's dominance. In 1965 the party held discussions with Menachem Begin's Herut party over a possible merger. A majority of the Liberals and Herut quickly approved the scheme, but some MKs, representing almost all the Progressive wing, declined to join the new alliance as they found Herut to be too militant. Seven mostly former Progressive Party MKs led by Pinchas Rosen broke away in protest to form the Independent Liberals on 16 March 1965. On 25 May 1965, the Liberal Party merged with Herut to form Gahal, a Hebrew acronym for Herut–Liberals Bloc (Hebrew: גוש חרות–ליברלים, Gush Herut–Libralim), though the two parties continued to function as independent factions within the alliance.

The formation of Gahal was a major turning point in Israeli politics, as it marked the first serious challenge to Mapai's hegemony. By the end of the Knesset session Gahal had 27 seats, only seven less than Mapai's 34 (reduced from 42 after 8 MKs, led by Ben-Gurion, had broken away to form Rafi).

Prior to the 1973 elections, Gahal merged with a number of small right-wing parties including the Free Centre (a breakaway from Gahal), the National List and the non-parliamentary Movement for Greater Israel to form the Likud bloc. The new party made history when it removed the left wing from power by winning the 1977 elections. The Liberal Party finally ceased to exist in 1988 when Likud became a unitary party.

In 1986, prominent Liberal Party leaders (none of whom were in the Knesset) who opposed joining the Likud established a party called the Liberal Center, accusing the present leadership of abandoning the party's traditional policies in order to accommodate Herut. The party was moderate in foreign policy; at the time it supported giving up of parts of the West Bank to Jordan in a peace treaty. It had a right-of-center approach to economic and social policies. In 1988, along with the Independent Liberals, it joined Shinui, forming the Center–Shinui Movement. The new bloc supported land for peace with the Arabs and the protection of individual rights, and opposed religious coercion. It was openly against joining a government led by Likud and the religious parties. It also differed from Labor in its support for a free-market economy.

Today, a remnant of the Liberal Party, the Israeli Liberal Group, remains an active member of Liberal International, which it joined in 1990.

Elected MKs in the Fifth Knesset 
 – Progressive  – General Zionists

Leaders

Election results

References

External links
Party history Knesset website

Political parties established in 1961
Defunct political parties in Israel
Defunct liberal political parties
Liberal parties in Israel
Zionist political parties in Israel
Political parties disestablished in 1988
General Zionism
1961 establishments in Israel
1988 disestablishments in Israel